Myer Christmas Parade was an annual event held in Melbourne, Victoria, Australia  organised by Myer Pty Ltd in conjunction with the City of Melbourne. Attracting a crowd of over 40,000, the parade commenced at the top of Spring Street and ended outside Myer's flagship Melbourne store on Bourke Street. Local newsreader Jennifer Keyte and other celebrities helped televise the Parade through the city though Channel 7 Melbourne. Radio station 3AW also broadcast the parade live.

Up to 2,000 people participated annually in the parade including dancers, celebrities, musicians, sports stars and, of course, Santa Claus, along with a host of Christmas themed floats.

Marking the commencement to the Christmas period, the parade also coincided with the opening of the Myer Christmas windows. Decorated with a different Christmas themed scene each year, the iconic Melbourne attraction drew up to 1,000,000 visitors each year.

The Myer Melbourne Christmas Parade was last staged in 2010.

Festivals in Melbourne
Annual events in Australia
Parades in Australia
Christmas and holiday season parades
Recurring events disestablished in 2010
2010 disestablishments in Australia
Summer events in Australia